Midreshet Ben-Gurion, also known as Midreshet Sde Boker, is an educational center and boarding school in southern Israel. Located in the Negev next to kibbutz Sde Boker, it falls under the jurisdiction of Ramat HaNegev Regional Council.

History
The construction of a field school began in 1962, inspired  by David Ben-Gurion's vision of developing a thriving Jewish culture in the arid Negev. The Jacob Blaustein Institutes for Desert Research, affiliated with Ben-Gurion University of the Negev, the Ben Gurion Heritage Institute, and a high school emphasizing environmental studies, are now located there. Ben-Gurion and his wife Paula Ben-Gurion are buried on the cliff overlooking the Zin valley.

Solar energy research 

The Jacob Blaustein Institutes for Desert Research has developed a solar energy research program focusing on how extremes of heat and cold in the desert can be mitigated through efficient storage of heat during the day for release at night.

An adobe house was built with rational fenestration, small windows in the northern side and heat collecting concrete prisms in the windows of the south facing wall. The prisms are situated in the rooms. They absorb heat during the day and can be rotated to allow the heat to discharge into the rooms at night.  The  "chimney" is part of an evaporative cooling system that maintains the temperature of the house during the day at bearable levels.

A double skin greenhouse uses copper sulfate solution as a heat screen during the day. The liquid is pumped between the two skins, protects the interior from ultraviolet rays and collects heat. At night the liquid is recirculated returning the heat to the greenhouse.

David Faiman of the Solar Center has made advancements in the realm of concentrator photovoltaics CPV. Faiman has produced a CPV unit capable of producing energy at a factor of up to a thousand more than conventional units.

Agricultural and biotechnology research
Researchers at Midreshet Ben-Gurion have made breakthroughs in agriculture and biotechnology relevant to drylands and sustainable agriculture. The STRS1 and STRS2 genes, master controller genes in stress responses, discovered by Dr. Simon Barak and his students in 2006, helped to elucidate some of the more important genes involved with abiotic stress responses 

Avigad Vonshak, Director of the Institutes from 2002 to 2010, made headlines for his discovery, together with Prof. Sammy Boussiba (also of the institutes) of astaxanthin accumulation in green algae. Astaxanthin is an extremely valuable poly-unsaturated fatty acid (PUFA) which is valued for its use as a pigment, nutritional value, and possible use in bio-diesel.

Notable residents
Gannit Ankori

Gallery

References

External links

Village website .
High school website 

Education in Israel
Community settlements
Populated places established in 1963
Populated places in Southern District (Israel)
1963 establishments in Israel
Commemoration of David Ben-Gurion